Jabal Umm Hayfā' is a mountain located in the Madiyan Mountains of northwest Saudi Arabia, near the Jordan border, above the Gulf of Aqaba, and is located in Tabūk, Saudi Arabia. It is one of the tallest mountains in the Arabian Peninsula.

References

Umm Hayfa
Midian